Joseph ben Eliezer Bonfils was a 14th-century Spanish author most notable as a supercommentary on the biblical commentary of Abraham ibn Ezra entitled Tzafnat Paneach. With greater clarity than ever before, Bonfils was responsible for elucidating Ibn Ezra's heterodox approach in a way that scholars hadn't yet uncovered.

References

14th-century Spanish writers
Spanish male non-fiction writers
Spanish theologians